Christianity is the predominant religion in Paraguay, with Catholicism being its largest denomination. In the most recent census (2002) Paraguayans of all ages 10 and older had their religious identities enumerated, and 89.6% were classified as Catholics. In 2018, respondents to a survey in Paraguay marked 88.3% of the country as Catholic and the second leading religion was Evangelism.

Self-identification of Paraguayans with no established religion is quite low by worldwide standards with only 1.14% of respondents enumerated as possessing no religious identity, this leads Paraguay to be classified as the most religious country in South America.

After centuries of Christian missionary activity, identification with the traditional indigenous faiths of the Paraguay region is even less, with 0.61% of respondents enumerated as possessing an indigenous religious identity.

Current situation 
According to article 27 of the Paraguayan Constitution of 1992, freedom of religion is recognised and there is no official religion. Relations between the State and the Catholic Church are to be based on independence, co-operation and autonomy. The independence of religious organisations is guaranteed.

As can be seen below, the majority of Paraguayans are Roman Catholic, although the percentage of Paraguayans who identify themselves as Catholic has dropped slightly. There has been a corresponding growth in the influence of Evangelical churches in recent years. There are a number of Indigenous religions and there are also Buddhist (probably due to immigration from Korea), Jewish and Muslim communities in the country.

Religions in Paraguay according to 2002 and 1992 censuses
The 2002 census counted 5,163,198 people in Paraguay but the question about religion was meant only for those aged 10 or older, namely 3,892,603 persons.

NB:
Traditional Christianity taken to include Anglicanism, all branches of Orthodox Church, Lutheranism, Presbyterianism and the Mennonites – all branches that had emerged by the end of the 16th Century (except Catholicism)
Post 16th Century Christian denominations includes: Christian and Missionary Alliance, Assemblies of God, Maranatha Baptist Church, Centro familiar de adoración aposent., Comunidad Cristiana, Plymouth Brethren – Open Brothers, Independent, Church of God (Pentecostal), Church of God of Prophecy (Pentecostal), Methodism, Free Methodism, Church of the Nazarene, Neotestimentaria (Baptist), Pentecostal, Other Evangelical, Seventh Day Adventist, Dios es Amor (Pentecostal), Universal Church of the Kingdom of God, Unification Church, The Church of Jesus Christ of Latter-day Saints (Mormons), Pueblo de Dios, Jehovah's Witnesses, Mount Zion Church & Other pseudo-Christian groups
 Eastern and Cultural Religions includes: Hinduism (Tao), Buddhism, Reyukai, Shinto & Baháʼí  ****Religions not previously mentioned in the 1992 census include: Rosacrucis, Spiritualists – E.C.Basilio, Umbanda, Other, Spiritualist, Mentalism, Indigenous Religions, Religions not included above & Unspecified other religion

Christianity

Roman Catholicism

Catholicism has a played a major role in shaping Paraguay's culture. Catholicism has long been the most important religion in Paraguay, with the Bishopric of Asunción created in 1547. The majority of government officials are Catholics and a number of Catholic festivals are public holidays (Holy Thursday, Good Friday, Feast of The Assumption of the Virgin Mary [15 August], Feast of The Immaculate Conception [8 December] and Christmas).

Many people mark the Feast of the Immaculate Conception with a pilgrimage to Caacupé. The Basilica of Caccupe contains a statuette of Our Lady of the Miracles. Pope John Paul II visited Caacupe in 1987.

The Church maintains the Universidad Católica "Nuestra Señora de la Asunción".

Protestantism
The second largest religious affiliation in Paraguay is Protestantism, which like in North America shows a wide array of denominations. Lutherans and Mennonites are the more traditional groups which are dominated by rather recent immigrants of European ancestry and their descendants, while Evangelical and/or Charismatic churches have spread in recent decades mostly in the vast and long-established Mestizo population.  The Bruderhof established a base in Paraguay in 1941, fleeing Nazi persecution. They left the country for North America in 1966, but returned and re-established themselves in 2010.

Latter Day Saints

The Church of Jesus Christ of Latter-day Saints (LDS Church) had 9,374 adherents according to the 2002 census but more recently (2015) claims to have more than 86,000 members and 139 congregations in Paraguay.

Jehovah's Witnesses

The Jehovah's Witnesses history in Paraguay dates back to 1924 with an Argentinian missionary named Juan Muñiz.
Through a government decree, dated January 3, 1979, the Government of Paraguay banned the work of Jehovah’s Witnesses in Paraguay. Legal recognition was approved on August 8, 1991 
In 2020, the number of Jehovah's Witnesses was 11,051 active publishers, united in 226 congregations; 25,792 people attended annual celebration of Lord's Evening Meal in 2020.

Buddhism
When Brazil decided to halt Japanese immigration in the 1930s, a Japanese land company built an agricultural settlement southeast of Asunción. Two more colonies near Encarnación followed in the 1950s; many Japanese settlers came from neighboring Bolivia. These immigrants brought Buddhism with them. Until the 1960s most retained their Buddhist faith, but since then many have converted to Christianity. Today there are roughly 2,000 practicing Buddhists.

Judaism

The first synagogue in Paraguay was established in 1917 by Sephardic Jews who had emigrated from Palestine, Turkey and Greece; though there had previously been some isolated Jewish settlers from Europe.

Ashkenazi Jews from the Ukraine and Poland founded the Unión Hebraica in the 1920s, while in the 1930s between 15,000 and 20,000 refugees from Germany, Austria and Czechoslovakia fled to Paraguay to escape the holocaust.  Many of these later moved on to Argentina, Uruguay and Brazil.  Those who remained were later joined by immigrants who were mostly survivors of the concentration camps.

Today, the Jewish community has around a 1000 members who live mainly in Asunción. There is a Jewish school Escuela Integral Estado de Israel. Asunción has three synagogues: Ashkenazi, Sephardi and Chabad and a Jewish museum.

Islam

The 1992 census recorded 872 Muslims in Paraguay, 486 of which were in the Alto Paraná department, the capital of which is Ciudad del Este. There are also communities in Asunción and Itapúa (the capital of which is Encarnación). As in other parts of Latin America, many of these are descended from immigrants from Syria and Lebanon, though some may also be from Bangladesh and Pakistan.

Baháʼí Faith

The Baháʼí Faith in Paraguay begins after `Abdu'l-Bahá, then head of the religion, mentioned the country in 1916. Paraguayan Maria Casati was the first to join the religion in 1939 when living in Buenos Aires. The first Baháʼí pioneer to settle in Paraguay was Elizabeth Cheney late in 1940 and the first Baháʼí Local Spiritual Assembly of Asunción was elected in 1944. By 1961 Paraguayan Baháʼís had elected the first National Spiritual Assembly and by 1963 there were 3 local assemblies plus other communities. Estimates of Baháʼís mention 5,500 (2001 report) or 10,600 (2010 report), though the state Census doesn't mention the Baháʼís.

References

External links
 Paraguayan Constitution 
 Dirección General de Estádisticas y Censos 
 Virgin of Caacupé 
 Jews of Paraguay